Zibahkhana (English: Slaughterhouse (literal meaning), Hell's Ground (English title)) is a 2007 Pakistani Urdu-English slasher film directed by Omar Khan. It premiered at the NatFilm Festival in Denmark and has been screened at festivals including Toronto, New York City, London, Neuchatel, Stockholm, Cape Town, Austin, Philadelphia, Cambridge, Puerto Rico, Sitges, Valencia, Oslo and Helsinki. The film passed censors in Pakistan (with nine seconds cut) and became the first non 35mm, HDV feature film released in Pakistan cinema history. It was shot in 30 days.

Plot

Late at night, a sole driver almost hits a mysterious figure in the dark. Following a car crash, he is attacked and killed by the figure.

Five friends skip school in Islamabad to go to a rock concert. Making up the motley crew are head-strong driver Vicki, poor scholar student Simon, wild child Roxi, horror fan OJ, and nervous, demure Ash.

As they enter the countryside, it becomes clear that there are issues with the water supply in the Pakistani countryside, with protests ongoing regarding this.

The five friends stop to buy hashish at a chaai house and are given a stark warning regarding the surrounding countryside, with a local sage proclaiming it "Hell's Ground" and warning that the devil will find them there. Laughing off the warnings, the teens continue on their odyssey. OJ becomes sick after eating a space cake, and the gang is forced to pull over. While getting sick in a stream, OJ is attacked by something unseen.

The teens are then attacked by zombies, with one small zombie getting into the van. The teens escape. Looking for help, the teens come across a holy man, who offers to show them to safety. The holy man asks for water in the van, which the teens do not have. The religious man pulls a severed head from a bag, and the teens force the holy man from the truck and run him over, presumably killing him.

The van runs out of petrol, stranding the teens in the jungle. Vicki, feeling guilty for getting his friends into danger, goes to find help. Coming across a cabin, he is attacked and killed by a burka-wearing maniac. Roxi is spooked by the severed head and runs into the jungle, eventually finding Vicki's corpse being butchered by the maniac. The maniac chases Roxi, and she seeks refuge in a cabin. A kind old woman takes her in and laments the loss of her son to marriage and the new motorway cutting off her village from the world. Noticing Roxi is injured, she leaves to find her son, a local healer.

Meanwhile, Simon and Ash notice OJ is gone. While looking for him, they find Vicki's keys and flashlight at the cabin he was killed and are chased by the maniac. Simon is killed, while Ash makes it back to the van.

While looking in the lady's cabin, Roxi discovers evidence that the maniac is the old lady's daughter and leaves the house after discovering her son's skeleton. In the jungle, the old lady finds her other son, the holy man, nearing death. Swearing revenge, she instructs her daughter to kill the remaining teens. The maniac breaks Roxi's neck.

Ash is chased through the woods, eventually defeating the maniac by fashioning a weapon from barbed wire and a stick and beating her to death with a rock. Retrieving the maniac's mace, she ensures the maniac is dead by staking her through the heart.

Victorious, as day breaks, she finds OJ. He turns to attack her as he is now a zombie.

Cast
 Kunwar Ali Roshan as Vicki
 Rooshanie Ejaz as Ayesha (Ash)
 Rubya Chaudhry as Roxi
 Haider Raza as Simon
 Osman Khalid Butt as O.J.
 Rehan as Deewana

Release

Home media
The film was released on DVD by TLA Releasing on 24 June 2008. It was later released by Danger After Dark on 4 August that same year.

Critical reception

Zibahkhana received mostly positive reviews upon its release. Ain't It Cool News praised the film, calling it "one of the most badass flicks of the year". The reviewer also noted that although the film had its faults, mainly that it was stupid and predictable, "it's got something so incredibly captivating about it that it has its own place in the line of truly great indie horror flicks". Dread Central awarded the film a score of 4/5, calling it "a genuinely weird and somber horror movie that transposes familiar narrative themes from the genre into a cultural aesthetic few in the West will have had any prior glimpse of." Film Threat gave the film a positive review, commending its effective visuals, and strong nighttime atmosphere. The reviewer concluded by writing, "Overall, a measured mix of clichéd horror bits and wit to joke about them keeps Hell’s Ground even for a horror audience." The "Lazy Dads' Guide to Movies" gave the film a scathing review, ranking it as the worst film they had ever seen.

Awards 

 Won "Jury's Award for Best Film of 2008" at the Riofan Film Festival, Rio de Janeiro, Brazil.
 Won "Jury's Special Award for Best Gore 2007" at the Fantastic Film Festival, Austin, Texas. 
 Won "Best Film" award at the Fantaspoa film festival 2009. Port Alegre, Brazil.

References 

 Fantastic Festival 2007 awards coverage
 Cinematical's coverage of the Fantastic Festival awards, 2007

External links 
 
 
 
 
 31 Flavors of Death – Bidoun magazine profile by Achal Prabhala 
 Article on Zibahkhana – Time Magazine
 Zibahkhana at Fantastic Film Festival 2007, Austin, Texas
 Hell's Ground at the 2007 Philadelphia Film Festival
 The Lazy Dads' Guide to Movies 
 https://www.podbean.com/media/share/pb-3spu8-abd5ea

2007 films
2000s Urdu-language films
Pakistani horror films
Pakistani slasher films
2007 horror films
Pakistani zombie films
2000s slasher films
Lollywood films
Urdu-language Pakistani films